FOX 33 may refer to one of the following television stations in the United States affiliated with the Fox Broadcasting Company:

Current
KDFX-CD in Palm Springs, California
KMSS-TV in Shreveport, Louisiana
WFXV in Utica, New York
WZAW-LD in Wausau/Rhinelander, WI

Former
KDAF in Dallas/Fort Worth, Texas
WISE-DT2 in Fort Wayne, Indiana
WTVZ in Norfolk, Virginia